Ashleigh Neville (born 29 April 1993) is an English professional footballer who plays as a defender or midfielder for Women's Super League club Tottenham Hotspur.

Career

Sporting Club Albion 
Neville began her career with her local club Sporting Club Albion. Her final season with the club was the 2012–13 FA WPL season in which she made 23 appearances and scored 14 goals in all competitions while her team finished fourth out of nine teams in the third level Northern Division.

Coventry United 
Neville joined newly founded Coventry City Ladies for the 2013–14 season. In her time with the club she had 69 appearances and 20 goals. She made 20 appearances for the club, now known as Coventry United, in the 2016–17 season, her final with the team.

Tottenham Hotspur 
On 14 July 2017 Neville was announced as having signed for Tottenham Hotspur after their promotion to the FA Women's Super League 2 for the 2017–18 season. Her former club Coventry United were title rivals with Tottenham Hotspur in the FA WPL Premier Division Southern Division, but ultimately fell four points behind Spurs who eventually won promotion. She appeared in 36 matches and scored a total of five goals during her first two seasons with the club. Neville was named Player of the Year for Tottenham for 2017–18, and was FAWC Player of the Month for April 2019. Tottenham's first top flight season would ultimately end prematurely, but Neville appeared in 13 of 15 matches and helped Spurs finish seventh out of twelve sides. It was announced on 12 June 2020 that she re-signed with Tottenham through the end of the 2022 season. The following season Neville would appear 12 times out of 22 possible matches in the WSL as Spurs would finish in eighth place.

Personal life 
Neville married her wife Liz in June 2022. She and her partner have two children, Blake and Remi. She previously worked as a primary school teacher before turning fully professional upon entering the WSL.

Career statistics

Club

Honours 
Coventry United

 FA Women's National League Plate: 2015–16

Individual

 FA Women's Super League Player of the Month: February 2022

 FA Women's Super League Goal of the Month: September 2022
 FA Women's Championship Player of the Month: 2018–19
 Tottenham Player of the Year: 2017–18

References 

Living people
1993 births
Women's association football defenders
Tottenham Hotspur F.C. Women players
Coventry United W.F.C. players
English women's footballers
FA Women's National League players
Sportspeople from West Bromwich
British LGBT footballers